Xanthophyllum tardicrescens is a tree in the family Polygalaceae. The specific epithet  is from the Latin meaning "slowly growing", referring to the twigs.

Description
The flowers are white, drying yellowish orange. The round fruits are yellowish green.

Distribution and habitat
Xanthophyllum tardicrescens is endemic to Borneo. Its habitat is mixed dipterocarp forest.

References

tardicrescens
Endemic flora of Borneo
Trees of Borneo
Plants described in 1973